The 1978 Colorado State Rams football team was an American football team that represented Colorado State University in the Western Athletic Conference (WAC) during the 1978 NCAA Division I-A football season. In its sixth season under head coach Sark Arslanian, the team compiled a 5–6 record (2–4 against WAC opponents).

The team's statistical leaders included Steve Fairchild with 905 passing yards, Larry Jones with 898 rushing yards, and Mark R. Bell with 459 receiving yards.

Senior defensive end Mike Bell was consensus first-team All-American

Schedule

Team players in the NFL

References

Colorado State
Colorado State Rams football seasons
Colorado State Rams football